"Live Again" is a song by American rock band Sevendust. The song was released as the second single off the band's third album Animosity.

Music video
The music video was directed by Noble Jones. The clip concerns a girl who gets thrown out of her house by her father, who pushes her out the front door as her mother and neighbors stand by watching.

"I've always been fascinated and disturbed by young people and children that get thrown to the street," drummer Morgan Rose said. "The video deals with this girl dealing with the fact that she doesn't have any money or food and there are always pig guys out there that are looking to do something terrible to somebody that's down."

The girl's not alone in her quest for survival. During the video, another woman appears to guide her away from trouble. "She acts as almost a guardian angel," Rose said. "Some people might take it in a religious way and other people might see it more as a spiritual thing. But it's really just about looking for somebody, not knowing where to find that person and needing help, and that person being available if you had just asked."

The band was filmed in an old, empty theater, and there are photo images in the background of the girl, the angel, the father and the lecherous antagonists. "As we're playing, the camera goes around the pictures, and then the still photos turn into real life," Rose said.

Track listing

Chart position
Billboard (North America)

References

Sevendust songs
2001 songs
2002 singles
Songs written by John Connolly (musician)
Songs written by Morgan Rose
TVT Records singles